Republic is a Hungarian rock band formed in Budapest in 1990. Their style is a mix of Western rock music and traditional Hungarian folk music. The band is popular in its native country and among Hungarian speaking minorities in other parts of the world.

Members
The two founding members are László Bódi and Lászlo Attila Nagy.  The two played together for a band called Cipőfűző (Hungarian for shoelaces).  From this name, László Bódi acquired the nickname "Cipő", i.e. shoe. Cipő died in March 2013 at the age of 47. The most recent change in the band's composition was in 1991 when the original lead guitarist Imre Bali retired and was replaced by Tamás Patai.

While not formal members of the band, András "Bundás" Szabó (violin) and Gábor Halász (acoustic guitar) perform with the band during their live shows.

On albums, Republic frequently refers to itself ironically as "the worst group in Hungary″. The logo of the band is a stylised fish which from a certain angle resembles a human figure.

László Bódi died on 11 March 2013 of heart failure.

Current members
 László Attila Nagy - drums
 Tamás Patai – guitar
 Csaba Boros – bass guitar and vocals
 Gábor Halász – guitar and vocals

Former members
László :CipőBódi † – vocals and piano – 1990–2013
"Rece Apó" - Bali Imre – guitar – 1990–1991
Szilágyi "Bigyó" László – drums – 1990
Zoltán Tóth – guitar, piano and vocals - 1990-2013

Albums

References

External links
  (in Hungarian)
 lyrics of their songs (in Hungarian)
 concert picture gallery

Hungarian rock music groups
Musical groups established in 1990